1882 Canadian football, contrary to popular belief the Canadian Rugby Football Union was not founded on Saturday October 21, 1882.  It was first formed on Saturday June 12, 1880. However, as the Québec teams failed to organize and only the Ontario teams were ready to assemble the CRFU failed to be a governing force in Canadian football history. It was reorganized on Saturday December 19, 1891. As for the Québec teams the season of 1882 opened on May 13 with the Britannia Football Club and Montreal Football Club playing to a 0–0 tie.  In the fall on October 4, the Britannia Football Club and Royal Military College Foot-Ball Club scored a goal but it was another 1–1 tie and the Brits were undefeated. On October 21 they defeated their cross-town rivals, Montreal 1 goal to nil and then defeated McGill 2 goals to nil to again capture the city championship.

References

 
Canadian Football League seasons